Andrew Obst (born 19 August 1964) is a former Australian rules footballer who played for Melbourne in the Australian Football League (AFL) and Port Adelaide in the South Australian National Football League (SANFL).

Port Adelaide (1987–1989, 1988–1999) 
Obst started his career in the South Australian Amateur Football League, representing the Australian Amateurs team at the 1988 Adelaide Bicentennial Carnival before playing for Port Adelaide. He was drafted to Melbourne with pick 37 in the 1987 VFL Draft but did not move until a few years later.

Andrew was a member of Port Adelaide's 1999 SANFL premiership team.

Melbourne (1990–1997) 
Andrew eventually joined Melbourne for the 1990 AFL season. An on-baller, Obst was also used as a centreman and tagger. He took part in seven finals matches while at Melbourne.

Personal life 
Obst came from a known Port Adelaide family; his grandfather Ken, father Peter and uncle Trevor all played with distinction for Port Adelaide. Andrew's uncle Trevor Obst is Brad Ebert's grandfather.

Sources

References

Holmesby, Russell and Main, Jim (2007). The Encyclopedia of AFL Footballers. 7th ed. Melbourne: Bas Publishing.

1964 births
Living people
Melbourne Football Club players
Port Adelaide Magpies players
South Australian State of Origin players
Australian rules footballers from South Australia
Port Adelaide Football Club (SANFL) players
Port Adelaide Football Club players (all competitions)